Kauê may refer to:

 Kauê (footballer, born 1983), Brazilian football player, full name Kauê Caetano da Silva
 Kauê (footballer, born 1995), Brazilian football player, full name Kauê da Silva, from São Caetano do Sul
 Kauê (footballer, born 1997), Brazilian football player, full name Kauê da Silva, from São Paulo
 Kauê (footballer, born 2004), Brazilian football player, full name Kauê Rodrigues Pessanha